Douglas Walter Plank (born March 4, 1953) is an American former professional football player and coach. He played as a safety for the Chicago Bears of the National Football League (NFL). Plank also played one year in the United States Football League (USFL) for the Chicago Blitz. He played college football for the Ohio State Buckeyes.

Early life 
Plank attended Norwin High School in North Huntingdon, Pennsylvania, where he played baseball, basketball, and football. His high school baseball batting average of .526 stood as a school record for over thirty years. Following his senior football season, Plank was voted MVP of the WPIAL’s Foothills Conference. 

He then played football for The Ohio State University, winning three Big Ten titles and participating in three consecutive Rose Bowls under legendary coach Woody Hayes. Plank played a reserve role at Ohio State starting only five games, playing mostly on special teams. One of those starts came against Northwestern his senior year in Chicago, where he was seen by a Chicago Bear scout.

NFL playing career 
 In 1975, Plank was drafted by the Chicago Bears in the 12th round. He spent his entire eight-year NFL playing career with the Bears. He became an instant starter with the Bears and was the first Bears rookie to lead the team in tackles. Plank was a favorite of Bears defensive coordinator Buddy Ryan for his hard hitting and aggressive style, so that he named his defense the "46 defense" after Plank's jersey number and his central position in the defense. 

Plank was considered one of the hardest hitting safeties in the game. That effort took a physical toll, and he retired before the Bears reached their peak in 1985. Plank and Gary Fencik were dubbed "The Hit Men", a fact referenced by Fencik in 1985's The Super Bowl Shuffle. 

In 1984, Plank played one season in the USFL for the Chicago Blitz. The Blitz head coach was future Pro Football Hall of Fame coach Marv Levy. The Blitz general manager was future Pro Football Hall of Fame GM Bill Polian.

After football 

After football, Plank became a franchisee of Burger King Corporation. He operated a total of twenty individual restaurants in three states over a twenty-year period. 

In 1995, Plank began working as a football analyst and has done work for Fox Sports, the Arizona Cardinals, the Arizona State Sun Devils, the University of Arizona Wildcats, and the Arizona Rattlers. In 1996, a Bears fan "Bearman" became the unofficial mascot of the Bears, and he wore Plank's Number 46 jersey. 

Since 2001, Plank has worked as a football color analyst for NFL and NCAA football on national radio broadcasts for Sports USA Media. 

He is also a licensed realtor in Arizona and real estate investor in Arizona, and currently manages commercial and residential properties in Arizona. He is also an investor for the McRae Group, which improves property through the entitlement process for future development. 

In addition, Plank is a popular seminar speaker, emphasizing the value of hard work, making wise decisions in one's personal life and working with competent partners for success.

Coaching career 
In 2001, Plank began his coaching career as a defensive coordinator in the Arena Football League for three seasons under former Dallas quarterback Danny White. In those three seasons, the Arizona Rattlers played in three consecutive Arenabowls. 

In 2004, Plank was hired by Arthur Blank to be head coach of the Georgia Force, an arena football team he owned in addition to the Atlanta Falcons. He was named the AFL's Coach of the Year in 2005 and 2007, leading Georgia to the playoffs in every season and in his first year, ArenaBowl XIX in 2005. In Plank's first four years as an AFL head coach, he won more games in that period than any other coach in the history of the AFL. 

In 2008, he was a seasonal assistant on the Atlanta Falcons staff. The Falcons played in the Wild Card round of the NFL playoffs. In 2009, he served as the assistant defensive backfield coach for the New York Jets under head coach Rex Ryan, the son of Plank's former defensive coordinator, Buddy Ryan. The 2009 Jets defense led the NFL in fewest total yards allowed, fewest points allowed, and fewest TD passes allowed. The Jets played in the AFC championship game versus the Colts. 

In 2010, Plank became a football program assistant at Ohio State. The Buckeyes earned a share of the Big 10 title with an 11–1 record and beat Arkansas in the Sugar Bowl. 

On August 31, 2011, Plank became head coach of the AFL's Philadelphia Soul. In his first year, the Soul compiled a regular season record of 15–3 after going 6–12 the previous year. The Soul played in ArenaBowl XXV versus the Arizona Rattlers. The Soul established new franchise records in wins, scoring, rushing, and defensive takeaways in 2012. 

On September 5, 2012 Plank became head coach of the 4-14 Orlando Predators of the AFL. After losing the first five games of the 2013 season, Orlando rebounded to make the playoffs before losing in the first round and subsequently retiring.

Head coaching record

Arena Football League

References

External links
 Coaching page on ArenaFan.com

1953 births
Living people
People from Westmoreland County, Pennsylvania
American football safeties
Players of American football from Pennsylvania
Ohio State Buckeyes football players
Chicago Bears players
Georgia Force coaches
Philadelphia Soul coaches
Orlando Predators coaches
Chicago Blitz players
National Football League announcers
College football announcers